Andrew Maxwell Haden (26 September 195029 July 2020) was a New Zealand rugby union player and All Black captain. He played at lock for Auckland and New Zealand from 1972 until 1985. He also played club rugby in the United Kingdom and Italy.

Life and career
Haden was born in Wanganui on 26 September 1950. He attended Wanganui Boys' College. He made his All Black debut in 1972, and his Test debut against the British Lions in 1977, going on to make 41 Test appearances and scoring two tries.  Of those 41 appearances, 8 were as captain of the All Blacks.  Haden was noted for his powerful scrummage skills and for his imposing presence at the lineout.  He played club rugby for Auckland, Harlequins in London and Algida Rome in Italy.  Off the field, he published his autobiography, Boots ’n All, in 1983.  By receiving royalties from the book, he ostensibly tested the sport's strict amateurism rules in force back then.  He ultimately prevailed, however, by claiming that being a writer was his profession.

Haden was a controversial player, who was accused of cheating and unsporting conduct.  The most infamous occurrence of this happened in a match against  at Cardiff Arms Park in 1978. The score was 12–10 in Wales's favour, when Haden and another New Zealand player, Frank Oliver, suddenly fell to the ground as if pushed. The referee awarded a penalty in the dying moments of the match, which Brian McKechnie kicked, winning the game for New Zealand. Later, Welsh legend J. P. R. Williams wrote that Haden should have been sent off. Despite the controversy however, the referee subsequently stated that the penalty had actually been awarded for an actual infringement against Oliver and not the Haden 'dive' as was thought. Haden did not, however, deny that the attempts to cheat the referee were pre-planned, something also confirmed by his captain Graham Mourie. The match happened on the same day as the annual 'Miss World' competition, which prompted Welsh cartoonist Gren to create a picture of the 'Miss World' event, but with Miss New Zealand lying on the floor, pretending to have been pushed. Haden made his last Test appearance in 1985 against .

Later years
Haden was an agent for various celebrities, including Rachel Hunter.  He was given the honorary position of Rugby World Cup Ambassador in 2010, but resigned the post after making controversial statements about a racial quota he alleged the Crusaders to be operating, calling Polynesians "darkies", and then suggesting women raped by sports stars may be partly to blame.

In 2003, Haden announced that he was beginning chemotherapy for chronic lymphocytic leukaemia. He overcame this bout of illness, but in February 2020 was diagnosed with lymphoma. He consequently died of lymphoma on 29 July 2020, at his home in Auckland. He was 69 years old.

References

External links
 Sporting-Heroes.Net – a profile and picture of Andy Haden
 

1950 births
2020 deaths
New Zealand international rugby union players
New Zealand rugby union players
Auckland rugby union players
Rugby union locks
Ponsonby RFC players
Deaths from cancer in New Zealand
Rugby union players from Whanganui
People educated at Whanganui City College
Deaths from chronic lymphocytic leukemia
Deaths from lymphoma